Ivan Bordi (21 January 1938 – 28 June 2021) was a Romanian water polo player. He competed in the men's tournament at the 1956 Summer Olympics.

References

External links
 

1938 births
2021 deaths
Romanian male water polo players
Olympic water polo players of Romania
Water polo players at the 1956 Summer Olympics
Sportspeople from Târgu Mureș